Ronald Henry Dunn (19 April 1928 – 2 June 2011) was  a former Australian rules footballer who played with Fitzroy and Essendon in the Victorian Football League (VFL).

Notes

External links 

		

1928 births
2011 deaths
Australian rules footballers from Victoria (Australia)
Fitzroy Football Club players
Essendon Football Club players
Northcote Football Club players